The Galápagos flycatcher (Myiarchus magnirostris) also known as the large-billed flycatcher is a species of bird in the family Tyrannidae. 
It is endemic to the Galápagos Islands, where it is present on all the main islands. Its local name is 'Papamoscas'. The species was once placed in its own genus, Eribates, based upon a supposed "very long tarsus".

It is the smallest member of its genus.

Its natural habitats are tropical dry forests and tropical arid shrubland with cacti.

The Galápagos flycatcher has become used to human visitors to the Galápagos Islands and flies towards large camera lenses, perceiving its own reflected image as another bird. It habitually perches on visitors and their cameras.

Gallery

References

Galápagos flycatcher
Endemic birds of the Galápagos Islands
Galápagos flycatcher
Taxonomy articles created by Polbot